Yrondu Musavu-King (born 8 January 1992) is a Gabonese professional footballer who last played as a defender for Indian Super League club Bengaluru and the Gabon national team. He is the son of Gabonese politician Augustin Moussavou King.

Club career
Born in Libreville, Musavu-King moved to France in 1994, aged only two. In 2007, he joined SM Caen's youth setup, after representing SC Hérouville and USON Mondeville.

After already playing for the reserve team, Musavu-King made his first team debut on 17 November 2012, starting in a 3–1 away win against US Breteuil, for the season's Coupe de France. Six days later he made his Ligue 2 debut, playing the full 90 minutes in a 1–0 home success over Angers SCO.

On 1 July 2013, Musavu-King renewed his contract for a further two seasons, until 2015, and was loaned to ES Uzès Pont du Gard on 30 August. After returning from loan in the 2014 summer, he was included in the main squad in Ligue 1.

Musavu-King made his top level debut on 28 September 2014, starting in a 0–0 away draw against RC Lens. He scored his first professional goal on 4 October in a 1–2 home loss against Marseille.

On 2 July 2015, Musavu-King signed a five-year deal with La Liga side Granada CF.

On 28 January 2016, Musavu-King was loaned to Ligue 1 side Lorient until the end of the season.

In July 2016, Musavu-King joined Italian club Udinese on a free transfer.. On 31 August 2016, he was loaned to French club Toulouse for the season.

In January 2019, he signed for French third-tier club Boulogne on a six-month deal with the option of a further year, and joined Le Mans of Ligue 2 in August 2019. He left at the end of the 2019–20 season after Le Mans were relegated.

On 10 March 2021, Musavu-King joined Indian Super League side Bengaluru FC. On 3 July 2021, he extended his contract for two more years keeping him at the club until 2023. He debuted for the club on 15 August in a 1–0 win over Maldivian side Club Eagles in the 2021 AFC Cup qualifying play-offs. He later played in all three group stage matches against ATK Mohun Bagan, Bashundhara Kings and Maziya S&RC. He made his ISL debut on 20 November against NorthEast United FC in a 4–2 win.

International career
Musavu-King made his debut for Gabon on 23 March 2013, starting in a 0–1 2014 World Cup qualifier loss against Congo.

References

External links
LFP profile 

Living people
1992 births
Sportspeople from Libreville
Gabonese footballers
Gabon international footballers
Association football defenders
Stade Malherbe Caen players
ES Uzès Pont du Gard players
Granada CF footballers
Udinese Calcio players
Toulouse FC players
FC St. Gallen players
US Boulogne players
Le Mans FC players
Championnat National 2 players
Ligue 2 players
Championnat National 3 players
Championnat National players
Ligue 1 players
Swiss Super League players
2015 Africa Cup of Nations players
Gabonese expatriate footballers
Gabonese expatriate sportspeople in France
Expatriate footballers in Spain
Gabonese expatriate sportspeople in Spain
Expatriate footballers in France
Expatriate footballers in Switzerland
Bengaluru FC players
Gabonese expatriate sportspeople in India
21st-century Gabonese people